R. M. Seneviratne Bandara Nawinne (born 24 February 1946) is a member of United National Party and a member of the Parliament of Sri Lanka. He was long time member of Sri Lanka Freedom Party but cross to the United National Party in 2015 General elections. He was appointed as a cabinet minister under the National Government led by Prime Minister Ranil Wickramasinghe.

Nawinne held key ministerial positions of the United People's Freedom Alliance and Peoples Alliance governments from 1994. Later in 2000 he was appointed as the Chief Minister of North Western Province

References

 

Living people
Members of the 9th Parliament of Sri Lanka
Members of the 10th Parliament of Sri Lanka
Members of the 11th Parliament of Sri Lanka
Members of the 12th Parliament of Sri Lanka
Members of the 13th Parliament of Sri Lanka
Members of the 14th Parliament of Sri Lanka
Members of the 15th Parliament of Sri Lanka
Chief Ministers of North Western Province, Sri Lanka
Sri Lanka Freedom Party politicians
United People's Freedom Alliance politicians
1946 births
Labour ministers of Sri Lanka
Culture ministers of Sri Lanka
Internal affairs ministers of Sri Lanka